Raemon Sluiter (born 13 April 1978) is a Dutch former professional tennis player and current coach. His career-high ATP singles ranking is World No. 46, achieved in February 2003. Though he achieved only limited success during his professional career, Sluiter reached four ATP finals in his native Netherlands, and also reached the semi-finals of the Davis Cup with the Dutch team in 2001.

He announced his retirement in February 2008, which took effect after he played his home event in Rotterdam. In April 2009 he returned to professional tennis, reaching the final of an ITF Futures tournament in Albufeira, Portugal having entered the tournament in the qualifying rounds. In June 2009 he reached the final of the Ordina Open, becoming the lowest ranked professional player (866th) in history to reach an ATP final.

Sluiter's best performance in Grand Slam tournaments was the third round, which he reached at Wimbledon in 2001 and in the French Open in 2004 and 2006. In the first round of the 2003 Wimbledon Championships, Sluiter stunned 20th seed and former World #1 Yevgeny Kafelnikov in five sets for one of the biggest wins of his career.

Junior career 
Sluiter excelled as a junior and won the Boys' Doubles title at the 1995 French Open, alongside compatriot Peter Wessels. The pair also reached the final of the 1995 US Open Junior.

Professional career 
Sluiter turned professional in 1996, and broke into the ATP top 100 for the first time in 2000. In the same year, Sluiter qualified for his first Grand Slam tournament at the 2000 Australian Open, where he defeated Andrea Gaudenzi in five sets in the first round for his first Grand Slam victory. In the second round, he was defeated by 16th seed Mark Philippoussis in four sets. At the 2000 Energis Dutch Open, Sluiter reached his first ATP final on home soil, where he was defeated by the veteran Magnus Gustafsson.

In 2001, Sluiter achieved his best result at a Grand Slam tournament, by reaching the third round at Wimbledon, where he lost to Arnaud Clément in a closely contested four-set match. He equalled this achievement at the French Open in 2004 and 2006, losing to Carlos Moyá and Martín Vassallo Argüello, respectively.

Sluiter was part of the Netherlands team which reached the semi-finals of the 2001 Davis Cup. In his only rubber of the tie, Sluiter faced a rematch against Arnaud Clément, who had defeated him at that year's Wimbledon, but was forced to retire while leading 2–1 in the third set. The Dutch team went on to lose the tie 3–2.

Sluiter's greatest scalp at a Grand Slam tournament came at the 2003 Wimbledon Championships, where he defeated former world No. 1 Yevgeny Kafelnikov in five sets in the first round. In the following round, he lost to Alexander Popp in another five-set match. That year also saw Sluiter reach his career high singles ranking of world No. 46.

On 20 November 2006, Sluiter dropped out of the top 100 for the last time, but continued to be ranked in the top 200 until his retirement in 2008. Sluiter's final tournament was to be the 2008 ABN AMRO World Tennis Tournament in his hometown of Rotterdam. Having received a wild card into the main draw of the tournament, Sluiter was defeated by eventual champion Michaël Llodra in the first round.

In 2009, Sluiter made a comeback to professional tennis. In June, he received a wild card to the 2009 Ordina Open in Rosmalen. Despite being ranked 866th in the world at the time, Sluiter reached the final of the tournament, where he was defeated by Benjamin Becker. This made him the lowest ranked player ever to reach an ATP tour final. Sluiter announced his second retirement in 2010.

During his lengthy career, Sluiter reached four ATP World Tour finals, all in his native Netherlands. In addition to his final appearances in Amsterdam and Rosmalen, Sleuter reached finals in Rotterdam and Amersfoort in 2003, losing on both occasions. Despite his limited success on the main ATP circuit, Sluiter won 10 ATP Challenger Tour titles during his career.

Though a singles specialist, Sluiter was also an occasional doubles player. Partnering Martin Verkerk, he reached two doubles finals during his career, in Tashkent in 2002 and Delray Beach in 2003, losing both finals. In 2003 he reached his career high doubles ranking of world No. 97.

Coaching career 
After retiring from his playing career, Sluiter became a coach. Since 2015, he has been coaching Dutch player Kiki Bertens. In 2016, Bertens reached the semi-final of the French Open.

Junior Grand Slam finals

Doubles: 2 (1 title, 1 runner-up)

ATP career finals

Singles: 4 (4 runner-ups)

Doubles: 2 (2 runner-ups)

ATP Challenger and ITF Futures finals

Singles: 17 (10–7)

Doubles: 10 (6–4)

Performance timeline

Singles

Personal life
Sluiter was born in Rotterdam. His father, Fred, was a caretaker at his former school and his mother, Cisca, worked as a part-time cleaner. He is a supporter of his local football team, Feyenoord, and during the 2003–04 season he was the club's official ambassador. He also enjoys snooker and is a fan of the band Pearl Jam. His girlfriend is former field hockey player Fatima Moreira de Melo.

References

External links
 
 
 
 

1978 births
Living people
Dutch male tennis players
Dutch tennis coaches
French Open junior champions
Sportspeople from Rotterdam
Grand Slam (tennis) champions in boys' doubles